Elections to South Ayrshire Council were held on 3 May 2007, the same day as the other Scottish local government elections and the Scottish Parliament general election. The election was the first one using eight new wards created as a result of the Local Governance (Scotland) Act 2004, each ward will elect three or four councilors using the single transferable vote system form of proportional representation. The new wards replace 30 single-member wards which used the plurality (first past the post) system of election.

Election results

Summary by ward 

|- class="unsortable" align="center"
!rowspan=2 align="left"|Ward
! % 
!Cllrs
! %
!Cllrs
! %
!Cllrs
! %
!Cllrs
! %
!Cllrs
!rowspan=2|TotalCllrs
|- class="unsortable" align="center"
!colspan=2 bgcolor=""| Conservative
!colspan=2 bgcolor="" | Labour
!colspan=2 bgcolor="" | SNP
!colspan=2 bgcolor="white"| Others
!colspan=2 bgcolor=""| Independents
|-
|align="left"|Troon
|41.8
|2
|20.3
|1
|23.9
|1
| - 
| -
|13.9
|0
|4
|-
|align="left"|Prestwick
|41.8
|2
|30.1
|1
|28.1
|1
| -
| -
| -
| -
|4
|-
|align="left"|Ayr North
|18.4
|1
|44.7
|2
|25.0
|1
|3.0
|0
|8.8
|0
|4
|-
|align="left"|Ayr East
|39.1
|2
|30.7
|1
|27.6
|1
|2.6
|0
| -
| -
|4
|-
|align="left"|Ayr West
|54.8
|2
|16.9
|1
|20.9
|1
| - 
| -
|7.5
|0
|4
|-
|align="left"|Kyle
|34.2
|1
|32.8
|1
|21.8
|1
| -
| -
|11.1
|0
|3
|-
|align="left"|Maybole, North Carrick and Coylton
|24.4
|1
|26.2
|1
|24.7
|1
| -
| -
|24.7
|1
|4
|-
|align="left"|Girvan and South Carrick
|37.3
|1
|29.6
|1
|33.1
| 1
| -
| -
| -
| -
|3
|- class="unsortable" style="background:#C9C9C9"
|align="left"| Total
|37.2
|12
|28.4
|9
|25.3
|8
|0.7
|0
|8.3
|1
|30
|-
|}

Ward results

Changes Since 2007 Election
†In May 2008, Ayr West Cllr Elaine Little resigned from the Labour Party and became an Independent. In February 2012 she joined the Scottish National Party.
††On 27 May 2008 Ayr North Cllr Douglas Campbell, resigned from the Labour Party and became an Independent. He joined the Scottish National Party on 19 May 2011
†††On 16 November 2009 Ayr East Cllr Eddie Bulik resigned from the Labour Party and became an Independent.

References

2007
2007 Scottish local elections
21st century in South Ayrshire